is a passenger railway station located in the city of Akashi, Hyōgo Prefecture, Japan, operated by the private Sanyo Electric Railway.

Lines

Station layout
The station consists of one side platform and one island platform connected by a level crossing. The station is unattended.

Platforms

Adjacent stations

|-
!colspan=5|Sanyo Electric Railway

History
Fujie Station opened on August 19, 1923.

Passenger statistics
In fiscal 2018, the station was used by an average of 1773 passengers daily (boarding passengers only).

Surrounding area
 Byobugaura coast
 Misaki Shrine
Seiryu Shrine
 Beach promenade (Harima Cycling Road)

See also
List of railway stations in Japan

References

External links

 Official website (Sanyo Electric Railway) 

Railway stations in Japan opened in 1923
Railway stations in Hyōgo Prefecture
Akashi, Hyōgo